The Gerbrandy Tower is a tower in IJsselstein, the Netherlands. It was built in 1961.

Description
The Gerbrandy Tower is used for directional radio services and for FM- and TV-broadcasting. The Gerbrandy Tower consists of a concrete tower with a height of 100 meters on which a guyed aerial mast is mounted. Its total height was originally 382.5 metres, but in 1987 it was reduced to 375 metres.

On August 2, 2007, its analog antenna was replaced by a digital one reducing its height by another 9 metres. Its height is now 366.8 metres.

This tower type is a partially guyed tower, which combines a lower free standing tower antennas with an upper guyed mast. If the structure is counted as a tower, it is the tallest tower in Western Europe. The Gerbrandy Tower is not the only tower which consists of a concrete tower on which a guyed mast is set. There is one similar but smaller tower with the same structure in the Netherlands, the radio tower of Zendstation Smilde, which consisted of an 80 metres high concrete tower, on which a 223.5 metres high guyed mast was mounted. This structure collapsed after a fire on July 15, 2011. Rebuilding of that tower started in late 2011 and was completed in October 2012; the replacement structure is also a partially guyed tower, now 303 metres high.

Naming
The tower is named after Pieter Gerbrandy, Prime Minister of the Netherlands during World War Two.

Nearby, there is another remarkable antenna: the KNMI-mast Cabauw, a mast used for meteorological measurements.

Another nearby antenna, the 196m high mediumwave transmitter Lopik, was demolished on September 4, 2015.

Fires in Dutch TV masts
On July 15, 2011, there was a small fire in the Gerbrandy tower. Only hours later, a similar tower in Smilde caught fire and collapsed, after which all transmitters in the Gerbrandy tower were shut down as a precaution, leaving large parts of the Netherlands without FM-radio and digital TV (DVB-T) reception.

Owner
The ownership of the tower is complex: the concrete main structure is owned by Alticom: a company established in 2007 that bought many assets from KPN. Alticom was part of the European TDG Group, but in June 2011 it was announced that all shares in Alticom were acquired by investment company Infracapital who are the infrastructure specialists of Prudential plc.

Alticom is the owner of the concrete base and the first three meters of ground around this base. The metal mast on top of the structure is owned by NOVEC, which is a subsidiary of the electricity transmission operator TenneT. And the ground on which the tower is built, excluding the first three meters around the base, is (still) owned by KPN.

See also
 List of towers
 List of masts

Sources

External links

 
 Drawings at SkyscraperPage.com
 World's Greatest Christmas Tree Foundation

Communication towers in the Netherlands
Towers completed in 1961
Towers in Utrecht (province)
IJsselstein
1961 establishments in the Netherlands
20th-century architecture in the Netherlands